Theodore Bernard Stockard (May 27, 1903 – September 23, 1962) was an American Negro league infielder between 1927 and 1931.

A native of Pueblo, Colorado, Stockard made his Negro leagues debut in 1927 for the Cleveland Hornets. He played for the Cleveland Tigers the following season, and finished his career with the Indianapolis ABCs in 1931. Stockard died in Los Angeles, California in 1962 at age 59.

References

External links
 and Baseball-Reference Black Baseball stats and Seamheads

1903 births
1962 deaths
Cleveland Hornets players
Cleveland Tigers (baseball) players
Indianapolis ABCs (1931–1933) players
20th-century African-American sportspeople
Baseball infielders